The 2010 IIHF InLine Hockey World Championship Division I Qualification tournaments were held in the summer of 2009. There were two qualification tournaments; an Americas qualifier and a European qualifier. The winners of these tournaments, Argentina and Croatia, advanced to the next level of the IIHF World Championship, which is the Division I tournament.

Americas qualifier
 became the Americas qualifier as the only other active member,  had already qualified for the 2010 tournament.

European qualifier

The 2009 European Qualification tournament was held from July 24, 2009, to July 26, 2009. The winner of this tournament, Croatia, advanced to the next level of the IIHF World Championship, which is the Division I tournament. Games were played at the Winter Palace of Sports in Sofia, Bulgaria.

Four participating teams were placed in one group. After playing a round-robin, the top team advances to the 2010 Division I tournament.

Nations

Standings

Fixtures
All times are local (UTC+3).

See also
2010 IIHF InLine Hockey World Championship
2010 IIHF InLine Hockey World Championship Division I

Iihf Inline Hockey World Championship Division I Qualification, 2010